Mills Watson (born William Oscar Watson on July 10, 1940) is an American actor who is probably best known for his comedic portrayal of the law enforcement character Deputy Perkins, first on B. J. and the Bear and later as a series star on The Misadventures of Sheriff Lobo. He played Uncle Buster in the sitcom Harper Valley P.T.A..

Personal life
Watson was born in Oakland, California and grew up on a ranch near Stockton. His father was a sheep rancher and his mother a school teacher. His grandparents were from Texas. He attended Franklin Elementary School and graduated from Elk Grove High School in 1958. His family did not have a television during his childhood and like most families of that era listened to the radio for news and entertainment. After high school he went to San Francisco State University for two semesters where he studied acting for a short time under Victor French.

After appearing in a small independent film, he wanted to pursue more formal acting training and he applied to and was accepted as a student at the Royal Academy of Dramatic Art in London, where he acquired a lot of stage experience. Says Watson, "I figured if I got in, I wouldn't have any excuse to fail on a training level. I could never say I didn't get the right kind of training, because this was the best in the world." Returning from England, he moved to Los Angeles and began appearing in television shows and movies, eventually retiring from acting in the early 1990s.

During the 1970s, he raised a son, Mason, as a single parent, with the help of neighbors and professionals when he was at work acting.

Now residing in Marcola, Oregon, where he lives on a 15-acre farm with his second wife Sue.When asked in an interview if he missed acting, he replied: "No. I was very fortunate to have been able to do as much as I wanted. I did enough of that. Today I have a fifteen-acre farm, growing hay. I just relax here with Sue. There's no pressure up here in Oregon. It's safe and it's not stressful at all, which I feel is keeping me alive."

Career
Watson appeared in guest roles in numerous TV series such  as Gunsmoke, Mission:Impossible, Hawaii Five-O, Emergency!, McCloud, M*A*S*H, The Rockford Files, The A-Team, CHiPs, and  Murder She Wrote, The Six Million Dollar Man, as well as movies including ...tick...tick...tick... (1970), The Wild Country (1970), Dirty Little Billy (1972), Charley and the Angel (1973), Papillon (1973), The Midnight Man (1974), Treasure of Matecumbe (1976), Up In Smoke (1978), Cujo, (1979) CHiPs, episode "Repo Man" as Doyle Ware (1983) and Bulletproof (1988). He also had a part in the TV miniseries War and Remembrance (1988), which he filmed in Hawaii. His last role was in the 1992 television film Gunsmoke: To the Last Man.

The acting role he considers his personal favorite and most fun was as Deputy Perkins on The Misadventures of Sheriff Lobo. He appeared on the March 22–28, 1980 cover of TV Guide as the character along with co-stars Claude Akins and Brian Kerwin.

Filmography

References

External links
 
 

1940 births
American male film actors
American male television actors
Living people
Male actors from Oakland, California
20th-century American male actors